Holy Grail is an American heavy metal band from Pasadena, California, formed in 2008.

History 
Holy Grail was formed in 2008 as Sorcerer by singer James Paul Luna, lead guitarist James J. LaRue and drummer Tyler Meahl, all ex-members of White Wizzard.  They recruited rhythm guitarist Eli Santana and bassist Eric Harris (formerly of Skeletonwitch) to complete the lineup. Before Holy Grail recorded their first extended play, bassist Blake Mount replaced Harris.

In 2009, the band released their first EP, Improper Burial, on Prosthetic Records. They went on to release their first full-length album, Crisis in Utopia, in 2010, to critical acclaim. The cover art for Crisis in Utopia was created by Andrei Bouzikov.

The band toured heavily from 2009 to 2012 in support of their first album. In November 2009, they supported 3 Inches of Blood and Saviours on a North American tour. In April 2010, they supported Amon Amarth on their North American tour. In June, they performed at the UK's Download Festival. In July 2010, bassist Jessie Sanchez took Blake Mount's place in the band; in October of that year, Mount returned to the band and Sanchez left. In August, the band performed at Germany's Wacken Open Air Festival. They then began their third North American tour, supporting Exodus.

In October 2010, the band parted ways with LaRue, replacing him with guitarist Ian Scott for the next few months. Scott's first performance with the band took place at Japan's Loud Park Festival. In December, the band toured North America for the fourth time, this time supporting Blind Guardian. In February 2011, the band toured North America again, supporting Eluveitie alongside 3 Inches of Blood. In March, the band embarked on a headlining tour of the UK, supported by Revoker.

In April 2011, the band parted ways with Scott, replacing him with guitarist Alex Lee (formerly of Bonded by Blood). The band then began its first headlining tour of North America, with support from Cauldron in the US (Holy Grail supported Cauldron on Canadian dates). In September, they toured North American again, this time supporting Toxic Holocaust. They released their second EP, Season's Bleedings, in December 2011.

In February 2012, the band performed at Australia's Soundwave festival. In March, they supported Saviours on another North American tour, including a performance at Austin's South by Southwest festival. In May, they supported DragonForce on their North American tour, alongside Huntress. In June, they supported Valient Thorr on their North American tour, alongside Royal Thunder. In October 2012, they supported Hellyeah on their North American tour.

The band's second full-length album, Ride the Void, was released on January 22, 2013. It was released in North America by Prosthetic Records and in Europe by Nuclear Blast.

Shortly after the release of Ride the Void, the band embarked on the Metal Alliance Tour, with Anthrax headlining, along with Exodus, Municipal Waste, High on Fire, and Shadows Fall.

Musical style 
Luna has described Holy Grail as "a modern band with a new twist of old-school metal with death metal riffs, modern breakdowns, and power-metal singing". Critics have described the band as playing traditional or retro heavy metal with thrash influences.

Discography

Studio albums 
 Crisis in Utopia (2010)
 Ride the Void (2013)
 Times of Pride and Peril (2016)

Extended plays 
 Improper Burial (2009)
 Seasons Bleedings (2011)

Compilation albums 
 Label Showcase – Prosthetic Records (2012)

Singles 
 My Last Attack (2010)
 Dark Passenger (2012)

Members 
Current members
 James Paul Luna – vocals (2008–present)
 Eli Santana – rhythm guitar (2008–present)
 Tyler Meahl – drums (2008–present)
 Blake Mount – bass (2008–2010, 2010–present)
 Donald Penn – lead guitar (2022–present)

Former members
 James LaRue – lead guitar (2008–2010)
 Eric Harris – bass (2008)
 Alex Lee – lead guitar (2011–2022)

Touring members
 Ian Scott – lead guitar (2010–2011)
 Jessie Sanchez – bass (2010)

See also 

 List of heavy metal bands
 List of Nuclear Blast artists
 List of Prosthetic Records artists
 Music of California

References

External links 
 
 

2008 establishments in California
Culture of Pasadena, California
Heavy metal musical groups from California
Musical groups established in 2008
Musical quintets
Organizations based in Pasadena, California